Jeremy Lamar Chappell (born June 10, 1987) is an American professional basketball player who last played for New Basket Brindisi of the Lega Basket Serie A (LBA) and FIBA Basketball Champions League. He played college basketball at Robert Morris University in Pittsburgh, Pennsylvania.

College career
A 6'3" swingman from Cincinnati, Ohio, Chappell played college basketball at Robert Morris under coaches Mark Schmidt and Mike Rice.  A four-year starter for the Colonials, Chappell led the team to a 24–11 overall record and both regular-season and tournament Northeast Conference (NEC) titles.  Chappell emerged as one of the brightest stars in the NEC, averaging 16.7 points and 6.3 rebounds per game on the year and was named the Northeast Conference Player of the Year at the close of the season.  In the 2009 NEC tournament, Chappell scored 15 points in the final, earning tournament MVP honors and sending Robert Morris to the NCAA tournament for the first time in 17 years.

Professional career
Chappell was not selected in the 2009 NBA draft, instead heading to Poland to play for Znicz Jarosław.  He spent the next three seasons playing in Ukraine for Hoverla and Ferro-ZNTU before moving to Russia to play for Triumph Lyubertsy.  After averaging 10.8 points and 4.2 points per game in VTB United League play in the 2013–14 season, he signed with Avtodor Saratov for 2014–15.

On August 28, 2018, Chappell signed a deal with Italian club New Basket Brindisi.

On July 22, 2019, he has signed with Reyer Venezia of the Italian Lega Basket Serie A (LBA). Chappell signed a one-year contract extension on June 29, 2020.

After two season with Venezia, on July 12, 2021, Chappel returns to Brindisi signing a 2-years contract.

References

External links
 VTB League profile
 Robert Morris Colonials bio
 TBLStat.net Profile

1987 births
Living people
American expatriate basketball people in Italy
American expatriate basketball people in Poland
American expatriate basketball people in Russia
American expatriate basketball people in Turkey
American expatriate basketball people in Ukraine
American men's basketball players
Bandırma B.İ.K. players
Basketball players from Cincinnati
BC Avtodor Saratov players
BC Hoverla players
BC Zaporizhya players
BC Zenit Saint Petersburg players
Lega Basket Serie A players
New Basket Brindisi players
Pallacanestro Cantù players
Reyer Venezia players
Robert Morris Colonials men's basketball players
Shooting guards
Small forwards